Iveta Lukošiūtė (born 29 June 1980) is a Lithuanian dancer and choreographer. She is best known for appearing as a professional dancer on Strictly Come Dancing between 2012 and 2014.

Early and personal life
Lukošiūtė was born in Klaipėda, Lithuania on 29 June 1980. Lukošiūtė began learning ballroom dance at the age of 6 when she was accepted as a student at the Žuvėdra Ballroom Dance School. She danced for pop groups, concerts and festivals throughout Lithuania, and appeared in several music videos.

Lukošiūtė married Jenya Raytses in August 2017 and they have two children together.

Dancing career
Lukošiūtė moved to Woodside, New York in 2003, where she went on to gain numerous dance titles including World Professional Ten Dance Champion, five time U.S. National & North American Professional Ten Dance Champion, four time U.S. National Classical Showdance Champion and two times World Classical Showdance Finalist.

In 2011, Lukošiūtė appeared on the eighth season of So You Think You Can Dance. She reached the top 20, however was eliminated on in the first week of competition.

Strictly Come Dancing
In September 2012, Lukošiūtė was announced to be joining the Strictly Come Dancing as a replacement for Aliona Vilani who sustained an injury, Lukošiūtė was paired with Vilani's partner, TV presenter Johnny Ball, who was the oldest ever contestant to appear on the show. They were the first couple to be eliminated from the series. Lukošiūtė returned to the show for the eleventh series where she was paired with actor Mark Benton. The pair landed in the dance-off four consecutive times, a Strictly record before being eliminated in the ninth week, leaving them in 7th place. In Lukošiūtė's final series, she was paired with rugby player and model Thom Evans, they were eliminated in week five of the competition which was described as a shock, leaving them in 12th place.

Whilst appearing on Strictly Come Dancing, Lukošiūtė made guest appearances on British television chat shows such as Daybreak, Loose Women and The One Show.

Highest and Lowest Scoring Per Dance

(*) Excludes extra score given by guest judge.

Series 10 
Lukošiūtė's first celebrity partner was television presenter Johnny Ball.

Series 11 
Lukošiūtė's second celebrity partner was stage and screen actor Mark Benton.

Series 12 
Lukošiūtė's third celebrity partner was former rugby player Thom Evans.

(*) Score given by guest judge Donny Osmond.

References 

Living people
1980 births
Lithuanian female dancers
Female dancers
Lithuanian expatriates in England
Lithuanian expatriates in the United States